Luchino is a masculine Italian given name. Notable people with the name include:

 Luchino Diruse, a hunter in the video game Identity V
 Luchino Nefaria, a fictional character
 Luchino Visconti (1906–1976), Italian theatre director
 Luchino Visconti (died 1349), lord of Milan

See also
Lucchino, surname

Italian masculine given names